Death and the Compass is a 1992 American thriller film written and directed by Alex Cox, based on Jorge Luis Borges' 1942 short story of the same name. It stars Peter Boyle, Miguel Sandoval, and Christopher Eccleston. Mexican actress Zaide Silvia Gutiérrez also appears.

The film was originally a 55-minute drama made for Spanish TV/BBC in 1992. Producer Karl Braun found further money to expand the film into a feature, but the film was not completed for four years. It was filmed on location in Mexico City.

The soundtrack was composed by Dan Wool and Pray for Rain.

Cast
Peter Boyle - Erik Lonnrot
Miguel Sandoval - Treviranus
Christopher Eccleston - Alonso Zunz
Zaide Silvia Gutierrez - Ms. Espinoza

Home media release
The making of the soundtrack is discussed in a conversation between Cox and Wool on the DVD release.

This also includes a 1976 original film short titled Spiderweb, which is another interpretation of the same Borges short story. National Film School graduate Paul Miller made the 33 minute drama using actor Nigel Hawthorne in one of his first screen roles.

Reception
Death and the Compass holds an approval rating of 17% on review aggregator Rotten Tomatoes.

References

External links
 

1996 films
Films directed by Alex Cox
Adaptations of works by Jorge Luis Borges
English-language Mexican films
1990s thriller drama films
Films based on short fiction
Films shot in Mexico City
1992 drama films
1992 films
1996 drama films
1990s English-language films
American thriller films